Clube Recreativo e Atlético Catalano, also known as CRAC, is a Brazilian football team from Catalão, Goiás. They play the fourth level national league Campeonato Brasileiro Série D.

History 
Clube Recreativo e Atlético Catalano were founded on July 13, 1931. The club won their first title, which was the Campeonato Goiano, in 1967, winning the competition for a second time in 2004. The club competed for the first time in the Série C in 2004, when they were eliminated in the third stage of the competition by Americano. CRAC competed in the Copa do Brasil in 2005, when they were eliminated in the first stage by Guarani. The club competed again in the Série C in 2007, finishing that year in the fifth place in the final stage. CRAC competed in the Série D in 2009 and the club were promoted to the Série C after finishing as runners-up for the 2012 season.

Colors and badge 

The club's color is sky blue. The CRAC badge has two stars, representing the two Campeonato Goiano titles won by the club in 1967 and in 2004.

Stadium 

CRAC play their home games at Estádio Genervino da Fonseca. The stadium has a maximum capacity of 12,000 people.

Current squad 
As of November 2021

Achievements 

 Campeonato Goiano:
 Winners (2): 1967, 2004
 Runners-up (2): 1969, 1997
 Campeonato Goiano Second Division:
 Winners (4): 1965, 1998, 2001, 2003

Managers 
  Júlio Sérgio (2015-2016)

References

External links 
  Official website